The Women's 100 metres B was a sprinting event in athletics at the 1976 Summer Paralympics in Toronto, for blind athletes. (Visually impaired athletes may also have been permitted to take part; the specifics are unclear from the International Paralympic Committee's records.) It was the first time that sprinting events had taken place for athletes other than wheelchair athletes.

Eight athletes from six nations competed in the heats, and the top six advanced to the final. Poland's Bozena Kwiatkowska, who ran fastest in the heats, withdrew before the final, leaving second fastest qualifier R. Laengen, of Norway, to take gold.

Results

Heats

Final

References 

Women's 100 metres B
Para